Strike Up the Band is a 1959 studio album by Tony Bennett with the Count Basie Orchestra. The album was released at first with the title Basie Swings, Bennett Sings as SR-25072, featuring a different cover and track order.

William Ruhlmann of Allmusic wrote "The band raves through tunes like "With Plenty of Money and You," and Bennett matches them, drawing strength from the bravura arrangements, while band and singer achieve a knowing tenderness on "Growing Pains.""

Bennett and Basie recorded two albums together in 1959. The other one, In Person!, was released by Bennett's record label, Columbia, while this album was released by Roulette, Basie's label.

Track listing
Side one
"Strike Up the Band" (George Gershwin, Ira Gershwin) – 1:33
"I Guess I'll Have to Change My Plan" (Howard Dietz, Arthur Schwartz) – 1:44
"Chicago" (Fred Fisher) – 2:07
"With Plenty of Money and You" (Al Dubin, Harry Warren) – 1:33
"Anything Goes" (Cole Porter) – 2:20
"Life Is a Song" (Fred E. Ahlert, Joe Young) – 2:49

Side two
"I've Grown Accustomed to Her Face" (Alan Jay Lerner, Frederick Loewe) – 3:02
"Jeepers Creepers" (Johnny Mercer, Warren) – 2:08
"Growing Pains" (Dorothy Fields, Schwartz) – 3:33
"Poor Little Rich Girl" (Noël Coward) – 3:30
"Are You Havin' Any Fun?" (Sammy Fain, Jack Yellen) – 2:42

The 1990 compact disc reissue included the ballad "After Supper"

Personnel
Tony Bennett - vocals
Ralph Sharon - piano and arranger
The Count Basie Orchestra:
Count Basie - piano
Thad Jones, Snooky Young, Wendell Culley & Joe Newman - trumpet
Benny Powell, Henry Coker & Al Grey - trombone
Marshal Royal & Frank Wess - alto saxophone
Frank Foster & Billy Mitchell - tenor saxophone
Charlie Fowlkes - baritone saxophone
Freddie Green - guitar
Eddie Jones - bass
Sonny Payne - drums

References

1959 albums
Tony Bennett albums
Count Basie Orchestra albums
Roulette Records albums
Albums conducted by Count Basie
Albums arranged by Ralph Sharon